Big Brother 2004, also known as Big Brother 4, was the fourth season of the Australian reality television series Big Brother, and was aired on Network Ten, starting on Sunday 2 May 2004, with the housemates entering the day before, and ended on Monday 26 July 2004, lasting 86 days. The season was billed as "back to basics, but with one small secret". In a return to the basic format of Big Brother 1 and Big Brother 2 that had been eschewed in favour of twists and surprises in Big Brother 3, all housemates were let into the house together and former surprise elements such as swimming pools and gym equipment were all exposed from the beginning.

The only main twist of the series was the prize money - which was raised from $250,000 to $1,000,000, but this was kept hidden from housemates until later in the season. Evicted housemates also received larger prizes than any season before, with every evictee receiving a top of the range Mitsubishi Lancer VR-X.

Two Intruders entered the house later in the game, and Miriam Rivera, the transgender star of the show There's Something About Miriam, entered as a houseguest near the end. The two Intruders were some of the least liked in all the four seasons, with Violeta being chosen for eviction by every single housemate, and then Monica, who already had a boyfriend outside, immediately started falling for Ryan, and she and Bree developed rivalry towards each other. When Monica was finally up for eviction, she was evicted with a large percentage of the votes. Mid-season, the housemates were able to see the unofficial premiere of The Day After Tomorrow.

The final contestants in 2004 were Bree Amer and Trevor Butler. Trevor won, and then proposed to his girlfriend on stage.. The winner announced of the finale was watched by 2.864 million Australian viewers.

Opening sequence
The opening sequence was similar to the 2003 opening sequence with some minor sound changes. The background colour is more gradient than the previous season. A scene of a green backyard appears between the diary room and kitchen scenes. The diary room chair is orange instead of red, and the evicted housemate in the titles was changed to blue. Lastly the 84 days was changed to the series 86 days.
The theme also was slightly remixed with the introduction of a guitar component.

Housemates

Nominations Table
The first Housemate in each box was Nominated for Two Points, and the second Housemate was Nominated for One Point.

Notes

 The two Intruders faced the Housemate Vote, in which the Housemates would decide which one of them should go home. The Housemates unanimously chose to evict Violeta.
 All Housemates were nominated by Big Brother after failing to give reasonable nomination reasons.  Had this not happened, Ashalea, Ryan, and Paul would have faced the public vote. Monica, as a new Housemate, was immune from eviction.
  On Day 65, Bree was incorrectly announced as the week's evictee. Bree later returned to the House, and the correct evictee, Wesley, was evicted on Day 68.
 Due to the previous week's eviction error, this resulted in a lack of time to nominates. As such, all Housemates were automatically nominated for eviction by Big Brother. For fun, Big Brother asked each housemate whom they wanted to save from eviction.

Special shows

The Secret Revealed
Gretal Killeen hosts the launch show of Big Brother Australia where a brand new house says hello to 14 brand new housemates but what they don't know is big brother's big secret, what is it?

Housemate Secrets
Gretal Killeen hosts a special where the housemates play a game of 2 lies and a truth, what is the truth? and will the housemates guess the secrets? Plus, daily show action including the morning after the night before of Igor and Aphrodite's argument.

The Fight

Meeting Miriam 
Meeting Miriam was a Special Live Show shown on Day 41, where Miriam Rivera entered the Big Brother House to help the Housemates with their Salsa Dancing Task.

The Secret's Out
Gretel Killeen hosts a live special where the housemates play a series of games with the winner being the first to learn Big Brother's secret and then will be able to tell a friend but must keep it a secret or face a massive price. Who will be first to learn the secret?

The Intruders
Gretel Killeen hosts the much anticipated live show where the introduction of the 2 intruders has arrived, how will the house react to their new playmates? Plus, house psychologist Carmel Hill puts in what the house is really going through.

Intruder Eviction
Gretel Killeen hosts a live show where the 2 intruders are facing the boot and whose journey will end - the housemates will decide but who will go: Monica or Violeta?

The Recount 
The Recount was a Special Live Eviction Show which it aired on Day 68.

The Countdown Begins
Gretel Killeen hosts the final nominations show joined by evictee Catherine where the final 4 will nominate for a surprise eviction but who will face the chop next? Plus, Gretel talks to the final 4 one on one.

Surprise Eviction
Gretel Killeen hosts a surprise eviction where the final 4 is about to become the final 3 but who will not make it to the final days: Paul. Bree or Ryan?

The Final Sunday Eviction
Gretel Killeen hosts the final eviction show before the final but which of the final 3 will not make it to the final day and miss out on the million: Paul, Bree or Trevor? Plus, Ryan returns on stage and has a big reunion.

Controversy and incidents
Housemate Merlin Luck staged a protest at his live eviction show. Upon entering the arena, he revealed a makeshift banner which read "Free Th Refugees". The letter E had fallen off and it was intended to read "Free The Refugees" in reference to Australian Government policy of mandatory detention of asylum seekers. Merlin placed gaffer tape over his mouth and refused to speak during the live show. The following night, when he returned to appear as a guest on the Nomination show, he apologised to Killeen for putting her on the spot and making her job difficult by refusing to speak during the eviction show. On this show Merlin spoke about his actions in the highest rating show of the timeslot for that night.

The producers were criticized for making a deal with housemate Ryan Fitzgerald who was permitted to wear a T-shirt that was branded with "MLS" (acronym for Massive Loser Squad). The T-shirts were being sold while the show was running and Ryan's friends admitted that a proportion of the profits was going towards votes to keep him in the house, thus giving him what was perceived to be an unfair advantage. However the producer pointed-out that many housemates had companies or local communities rally support for them, which was little different, and that there was nothing stopping any other housemate's supporters doing a similar thing to Ryan's friends. Ryan has instead insisted on his radio program that his friends were not using the money to buy votes and instead spending it on alcohol.

Housemate Bree Amer was incorrectly evicted instead of Wesley due to a vote counting error. The error was discovered after the Sunday night eviction show. Bree had already met up with friends and family. She was returned to the house the following night (Monday). Wesley was evicted in a special show on the following Thursday.

Reception

Australian TV ratings
MONDAY - FRIDAY DAILY SHOW

References

2004 Australian television seasons
04